Uzal, in the Hebrew Bible, is a descendant of Joktan (Book of Genesis 10:27 ; 1 Chronicles 1:21),  whose settlements are traced in the ancient name of Sanaʽa, the capital city of the Yemen. He was believed to be the founder of an Arabian tribe. Uzal was the sixth of thirteen sons of Joktan. As noted in Genesis 10:26 - 10:29, Joktan became the father of Almodad and Sheleph and Hazarmaveth and Jerah and Hadoram and Uzal and Diklah and Obal and Abimael and Sheba and Ophir and Havilah and Jobab.

Occurring in a series of genealogies intended to trace every race known to the ancient Hebrews to one of Noah's children, the Hebrew name Uzal probably referred to the region of Azāl around modern Sana'a in Yemen.

See also
 Joktan

References

Book of Genesis people
Books of Chronicles people